Yevsevyev (masculine) or Yevsevyeva (feminine) is a Russian last name, a variant of Yevseyev.

People with the last name
Makar Yevsevyev, Russian linguist who studied the Moksha language

Toponyms
Yevsevyeva, alternative name of Yevseyevo, a rural locality (a village) in Ulitinskoye Rural Settlement of Pavlovo-Posadsky District in Moscow Oblast, Russia;

See also
Yevsevyevo, several rural localities in Russia

References

Notes

Sources
И. М. Ганжина (I. M. Ganzhina). "Словарь современных русских фамилий" (Dictionary of Modern Russian Last Names). Москва, 2001. 

Russian-language surnames
